Tim Söderström (born 4 January 1994) is a Swedish footballer who plays for IF Brommapojkarna as a full-back or central midfielder.

Career
Söderström joined Djurgårdens IF as a youth player from IF Brommapojkarna together with Simon Tibbling at the start of 2011. After a successful 2012 season with the U19 team he received the "Youth Player of the Year" award from the club and moved up into the U21 team at the start of 2013. Eventually Söderström made his senior debut in Djurgårdens IF coming on as a sub in the top Swedish division Allsvenskan against Gefle IF in the 82nd minute on 27 October 2013.

In August 2018, Söderström signed a two-year contract with Hammarby IF, thus leaving Brommapojkarna upon his contract expiration in January 2019.

On 31 January 2021, Söderström transferred from Hammarby to Marítimo in the Portuguese Primeira Liga.

On 29 July 2022, Söderström returned to IF Brommapojkarna on a contract until the end of 2023 season. In the 2022 season, he helped the club return to Allsvenskan.

Honours

Club
Jönköpings Södra
 Superettan: 2015

Brommapojkarna
 Superettan: 2017

References

External links

1994 births
Footballers from Stockholm
Living people
Swedish footballers
Sweden youth international footballers
Association football midfielders
Djurgårdens IF Fotboll players
Jönköpings Södra IF players
Assyriska FF players
IF Brommapojkarna players
Hammarby Fotboll players
C.S. Marítimo players
Allsvenskan players
Superettan players
Primeira Liga players
Swedish expatriate footballers
Expatriate footballers in Portugal
Swedish expatriate sportspeople in Portugal